Gunset Hill is a mountain located in Central New York Region of New York west of Richfield Springs, New York. It is located on the old Indian trail leading 
from the Mohawk castles on the Mohawk River, to the lands of the other Iroquois nations. At one point it was referred to as Bennets Hill. The hill derives its name because early settlers used to set guns for bear hunting, which were very numerous on the hill in those days.

References

Mountains of Otsego County, New York
Mountains of New York (state)